Henry Brougham, FRSE, of Brougham Hall (1742–1810), was an important landowner in north west England whose estates extended throughout much of Westmorland. 

A Scots Advocate, in 1802 he relaunched the Edinburgh Review with the help of his son, who was later created Baron Brougham and Vaux.

Life
He was born at Scales Hall, Cumberland, on 18 June 1742, the son of Henry Brougham (d. 1782), Steward to the Duke of Norfolk, and Mary Freeman (1714–1807). His younger brother was Rev John Brougham FRSE (1748–1811). The family moved to Brougham Hall in 1756.

Educated at Eton College, Brougham then trained as a lawyer at Gray's Inn from 1765,
before marrying and moving to Edinburgh. He resided at No. 21, on the north side of St Andrew Square, in what was then, a brand new Georgian townhouse and it is here that he established himself in the Scots legal scene.

He was elected a Fellow of the Royal Society of Edinburgh in 1784, one of his proposers being his father-in-law, William Robertson.

Brougham died on 13 February 1810 in Edinburgh and was buried at Restalrig Church.

Family
Brougham married in 1777 Eleanor Syme, daughter of the Rev James Syme and niece of William Robertson FRSE.  They had six children, one daughter and five sons.

Their eldest son became Henry Brougham, 1st Baron Brougham and Vaux (1778–1868); their youngest son, William (1795–1886) succeeded him in the barony in 1868, all other sons having already died by then.

See also
 Burke's Peerage & Baronetage

References

18th-century British landowners
1742 births
1810 deaths
People educated at Eton College
Members of Gray's Inn
People from Westmorland
People associated with Edinburgh
Fellows of the Royal Society of Edinburgh